Mtsignobartukhutsesi the head of notaries, composer of documents in feudal Georgia. From the beginning of the 12fth century - the head of government, or Chancellor, the first person after the king.

Following the ecclesiastic Council of Ruisi-Urbnisi of 1103, David IV separated the main authoritative institutions - internal, military and finances and put them under direct supervision of Royal councilor - Mtsignobartukhutses-Chkondideli this position was usually kept by the archbishop of Chqondidi who united in his hands both ecclesiastical and secular powers. From the end of the 15th century, the post lost its initial significance.

See also 
Court officials of the Kingdom of Georgia

References 

Noble titles of Georgia (country)
Georgian words and phrases